2008 Hockenheimring GP2 Series round was a GP2 Series motor race held on July 19 and 20, 2008 at the Hockenheimring in Baden-Württemberg, Germany. It was the sixth round of the 2008 GP2 Series season. The race weekend supported the 2008 German Grand Prix.

Classification

Qualifying

Feature race

Sprint race

References

Hockenheimring
GP2